Dream FM may refer to:

 Dream FM (Leeds), a former pirate radio station in Leeds, United Kingdom
 Dream FM (London), a former pirate radio station based in London, United Kingdom
 Dream FM Network, a radio network based in the Philippines
 Dream 100, a radio station broadcasting in Colchester, United Kingdom
 Chelmsford Radio, known until February 2009 as "Dream 107.7 FM"